"Ain't Nobody Here but Us Chickens" is a jump blues song, written by Alex Kramer and Joan Whitney. Louis Jordan and his Tympany Five recorded the song on June 26, 1946, and Decca Records released it on a 78 rpm record. It was added to the Grammy Hall of Fame in 2013.

The single debuted on Billboard magazine's Rhythm and Blues Records Chart on December 14, 1946. It reached number one and remained at the top position for seventeen weeks, longer than any other Jordan single.  It also reached number six on the broader Billboard Hot 100 singles chart. The  flip side, "Let the Good Times Roll", peaked at number two on the R&B chart.

Jordan's hit song popularized the expression "Nobody here but us chickens", but the phrase is older. Its first known appearance was a joke published as a reader-submitted anecdote in Everybody's Magazine in 1908 regarding a chicken thief, formulated as, Deed, sah, dey ain't nobody hyah 'ceptin' us chickens." From there, it was picked up by newspapers and reprinted far and wide.

References

External links

1946 songs
Decca Records singles
Louis Jordan songs
Blues songs
Songs written by Alex Kramer
Songs written by Joan Whitney (songwriter)
Grammy Hall of Fame Award recipients